Benton Township is a rural township in Carver County, Minnesota, United States. The population was 939 as of the 2000 census.

History
Benton Township was organized in 1858, and named for Thomas Hart Benton, a U.S. Senator from Missouri.

Geography

The city of Cologne is located entirely within the township geographically but is a separate entity.

Township 115 North, Range 25 West, Fifth Principal Meridian of the Public Land Survey System.

Lakes
 Bachman Lake
 Barlous Lake
 Hoefkin Lake (vast majority)
 Maria Lake (west three-quarters)
 Meuwissen Lake (west edge)
 Myers Lake
 Rice Lake (vast majority)
 Winkler Lake

Adjacent townships
 Waconia Township (north)
 Laketown Township (northeast)
 Dahlgren Township (east)
 San Francisco Township (southeast)
 Hancock Township (south)
 Washington Lake Township, Sibley County (southwest)
 Young America Township (west)
 Camden Township (northwest)

Unincorporated communities
 Bongards
 Gotha

Cemeteries
The township contains five cemeteries: Cologne United Methodist, Saint Bernard, Saint John's United Church of Christ, Snapsburg and Zion Lutheran Church.

Major highways
  U.S. Highway 212
  Minnesota State Highway 5

Demographics

As of the census of 2000, there were 939 people, 307 households, and 249 families residing in the township. There were 311 housing units at an average density of 9.2/sq mi (3.5/km). The racial makeup of the township was 99.47% White, 0.11% Native American, 0.32% Asian, 0.11% from other races. Hispanic or Latino of any race were 0.53% of the population.

There were 307 households, out of which 38.8% had children under the age of 18 living with them, 72.6% were married couples living together, 4.2% had a female householder with no husband present, and 18.6% were non-families. 15.0% of all households were made up of individuals, and 6.5% had someone living alone who was 65 years of age or older.  The average household size was 3.06 and the average family size was 3.43.

In the township the population was spread out, with 28.1% under the age of 18, 9.6% from 18 to 24, 26.6% from 25 to 44, 23.6% from 45 to 64, and 12.0% who were 65 years of age or older.  The median age was 37 years. For every 100 females, there were 115.4 males.  For every 100 females age 18 and over, there were 116.3 males.

The median income for a household in the township was $62,574, and the median income for a family was $63,839. Males had a median income of $38,173 versus $28,917 for females. The per capita income for the township was $22,652.  About 1.2% of families and 2.6% of the population were below the poverty line, including 2.4% of those under age 18 and 8.8% of those age 65 or over.

Government

References
 United States National Atlas
 United States Census Bureau 2007 TIGER/Line Shapefiles
 United States Board on Geographic Names (GNIS)

Townships in Carver County, Minnesota
Townships in Minnesota
Populated places established in 1858
1858 establishments in Minnesota